Parabathymyrus karrerae is an eel in the family Congridae (conger/garden eels). It was described by Emma Stanislavovna Karmovskaya in 1991. It is a marine, deep water-dwelling eel which is known from Cape Tala and Madagascar, in the western Indian Ocean. It dwells at a depth range of 260–405 metres.

The species epithet honours ichthyologist Christine Karrer.

References

Congridae
Fish described in 1991